On January 1, 1994, the Zapatista Army of National Liberation (EZLN) coordinated a 12-day Zapatista uprising in the state of Chiapas, Mexico in protest of the enactment of the North American Free Trade Agreement. The rebels occupied cities and towns in Chiapas, releasing prisoners and destroying land records. After battles with the Mexican Army and police, a ceasefire was brokered on January 12. Around 300 people were killed.

The revolt gathered international attention, and 100,000 people protested in Mexico City against the government's repression in Chiapas.

Background
Disease, enslavement, and exploitation have affected and devastated many American Indigenous communities, and the effects of colonization have continued to affect Mexican Indigenous communities. Indigenous people make up 15% of Mexico's population, and in 2011, the demographic also made up the majority of the 18% of Mexico's population living with food insecurity. About a third of people in Mexico's southernmost state of Chiapas identify as indigenous. The state has the second highest poverty rate following the state of Guerrero. About half of the Indigenous population in Chiapas reported no income in the 2010 census with another 42% of individuals earning less than $5 a day. Indigenous people in the state have also been impacted by malnutrition as well as restricted access to health and education services. Economic oppression was also visible during the 1950s when Indigenous people were prevented from entering San Cristobal city limits and instead had to sell some of their items to intermediaries at values much lower than the actual items' worth.

Following the Tlatelolco massacre, the Mexican government continued to suppress instances of political mobilization and social organization as part of what is known as the Dirty War. Despite the threat of government persecution, campesino organizations as well as small armed groups began to form in Chiapas in the 1970s. In efforts to suppress Indigenous resistance in the region, farm and land owners created paramilitary forces sponsored by the Mexican government designed to violently reciprocate against potential Indigenous defiance. At the same time, many Indigenous individuals known as guerrilleros formed small armed militant groups in response to persecution, one of which became the EZLN.

Carlos Salinas was elected president of Mexico in 1988, and while he promised to utilize government funding to assist poor states like Chiapas, residents never saw the money controlled by the Institutional Revolutionary Party. The catalyst for the EZLN's decision to revolt was the 1991 revision of Article 27 in Mexico's 1917 revolutionary constitution. Under Article 27, Native communal landholdings or ejidos were protected from sale or privatization. With the removal of Article 27, Native farmers feared the loss of their remaining lands and cheap imports from the US. In the year before the rebellion, the EZLN designated Subcomandante Marcos (Spanish for "Subcommander") as the ideological leader of the uprising and also made plans to declare war on the state of Mexico. Marcos was unique in his leadership because unlike most of the uprising's participants, his ethnicity was mestizo instead of indigenous. EZLN declared war on the Mexican state on January 1, 1994 to protest NAFTA's implementation.

Events
On the day of the uprising, Tzotzil, Tzeltal, Tojolab'al, and Ch'ol individuals attacked civic centers such as city halls in many towns including San Cristóbal de las Casas, Altamirano, Las Margaritas, Ocosingo, and Chanal. Rebels wore ski masks and utilized furniture and other office materials to barricade themselves inside of buildings once they had taken them over. During the occupation of the city, rebels also painted pro-Zapatista statements on the walls of buildings. In San Cristóbal de las Casas, the Zapatistas released 230 predominantly Indigenous prisoners and also demolished land records. Soon after, Subcomandante Marcos stated the EZLN's declaration of war against the Mexican state. Hours later, the Zapatista rebels abandoned San Cristóbal de las Casas so the Mexican Army could later recapture it. Despite the lack of resistance in San Cristóbal de las Casas, when 600 Zapatista rebels overtook the town of Altamirano, a battle with government forces ensued. In Chanal, the Zapatistas stated the purpose of their uprising; days later the town would be recaptured. In Ocosingo, rebels were met by police forces who retaliated violently against Zapatista occupation. The Mexican army also responded to the attacks and by the end of that week all rebels had been driven out of occupied towns and into the Lacandon Jungle where some fighting would continue for five more days. A ceasefire was finally called by the Mexican government on January 12, 1994. It was estimated that about 300 people died in the duration of the conflict.

Aftermath
After the ceasefire, Manuel Camacho was designated the government representative for peace relations between the Mexican state and the Zapatistas. On February 21, 1994, members of the EZLN, Manuel Camacho, and intermediary bishop Samuel Ruiz met in San Cristóbal de las Casas to discuss peace agreements. However, the EZLN rejected government propositions on June 12. Peace discussions were also further interrupted by the Mexican army's invasion of the land that Zapatistas had occupied in February 1995. The San Andrés Accords peace agreement was finally signed by the Zapatistas and Mexican government in February 1996. The San Andrés Accords provided the Zapatistas a level of autonomy in Chiapas for some time.

The uprising had attracted worldwide media attention. While human rights organizations emphasized the marginalization of the indigenous population, Riordan Roett (adviser to the Emerging Markets Group of the Chase Manhattan Bank) stated in January 1995:
While Chiapas, in our opinion, does not pose a fundamental threat to Mexican political stability, it is perceived to be so by many in the investment community. The government will need to eliminate the Zapatistas to demonstrate their effective control of the national territory and of security policy.

Support 
During the rebellion, a gathering of about 100,000 people in Mexico City protested against the attempted government suppression of the Zapatistas. Other protesters also engaged in marches, road blocks, sit-ins, and strikes even until the Indigenous Rights Bill became a law in 2001.

See also
Mexican Dirty War

References

1994 in Mexico
Conflicts in 1994
January 1994 events in Mexico
20th-century revolutions
Anarchist revolutions
Peasant revolts
Chiapas
Rebellions in Mexico
Separatism in Mexico
Wars involving Mexico
Wars involving the indigenous peoples of North America
Zapatista Army of National Liberation